Rutger Hoedemaekers (born 1976) is a Brussels-based Dutch composer and producer.

Career

Early life and career 
Hoedemaekers' interest in music was first sparked when he started making electronic compositions on a Commodore Amiga 500 as a pre-teen and became part of the demoscene. A few years later, he worked as an ambient and techno producer within the emerging Dutch electronic music scene. He subsequently enrolled in the Royal Conservatory in The Hague, but left after one year and started working with rock bands instead, gaining experience in writing and producing.

2006–2011: About, Voicst and move to Berlin 
Hoedemaekers' first solo project came in the form of About, an indie electro-pop act. About's debut album Bongo was released on Jason Forrest's Cock Rock Disco label in 2006. For live shows, Hoedemaekers was joined on stage by Marg van Eenbergen.

In 2007, Hoedemaekers co-produced an album for a indie rock band Voicst alongside Peter Katis (Interpol, The National) and joined the band as a keyboard player. In the same year, Rutger moved to Berlin to start a modular studio in Kreuzberg together with two friends. This studio became a creative hub for composers like Jóhann Jóhannsson, Dustin O’Halloran and Hildur Gudnadottir.

He collaborated with a number of artists during that time, such as New York-based Ethel (string quartet) for Festival Mundial.

2011–2015: Bart Constant 
In Berlin, Rutger started his second solo project under the name Bart Constant. His debut Tell Yourself Whatever You Have To was released on PIAS Recordings in 2011 to critical acclaim. His video for the single Do Better, featuring Dustin O'Halloran, won Best Music Video at the Netherlands Film Festival that same year.

2015–present: Film and TV score work 
While still performing as Bart Constant, Hoedemaekers also started working as a composer under his own name for film and TV. In 2015, Jóhann Jóhannsson asked him to co-compose the score for Icelandic crime series Trapped (BBC Four, France 2, ZDF), together with Hildur Gudnadottir. Their original score for the series was awarded with an Edda Award for Best Music in 2016. Hoedemaekers also worked with Jóhannsson on Darren Aronofsky's mother! and James Marsh's The Mercy, for which he composed additional music.

In 2018, Hoedemaekers scored his first feature as a solo composer for German production The Last Berliner, which won Best Feature at the Manchester Film Festival. He subsequently  created the original score for Hulu and ARTE production No Man's Land, which premiered in 2020. The soundtrack album was released by Lakeshore Records on November 13.

In 2020, Hoedemaekers signed with FatCat Records's imprint 130701. His debut record on the label, The Age of Oddities, was released on March 5, 2021.

In 2022, he contributed eight original pieces to Ed Perkins' HBO documentary The Princess, alongside a score by Martin Phipps. Hoedemaekers went on to create the original score for Shangri-La, Paradise Under Construction, which premiered at 2022 edition of IDFA.

Discography 
Studio albums

 The Age of Oddities (2021, FatCat Records/130701)

Soundtrack albums

Trapped (2019, Milan Records)
The Last Berliner (2019, Nouveau Goût)
No Man's Land (2020, Lakeshore Records)

Filmography

Awards and nominations

References

External links 

1976 births
People from Nijmegen
Living people
Royal Conservatory of The Hague alumni
Musicians from Berlin
Dutch expatriates in Germany
Dutch expatriates in Belgium
20th-century Dutch composers
20th-century Dutch male musicians
21st-century Dutch composers
21st-century male musicians
Dutch film score composers
Dutch record producers
Male film score composers
Male composers